Events in the year 1922 in Belgium.

Incumbents
Monarch – Albert I
Prime Minister – Georges Theunis

Events

Publications
 Annales de l'Académie royale d'archéologie de Belgique, 6th series, vol. 10.

Art and architecture

Births

Deaths
 22 March – Frans Jozef Peter van den Branden (born 1837), writer
 22 November – Louise De Hem (born 1866), painter

References

 
1920s in Belgium
Belgium
Years of the 20th century in Belgium
Belgium